Craig Makepeace is an Australian former professional rugby league footballer who played for the North Sydney Bears as a .

Playing career
Makepeace made his debut for North Sydney in round 14 of the 1992 season against the Gold Coast Seagulls kicking three goals in a 19–6 victory.  

In 1993, Makepeace had his most successful season managing to secure a spot on the wing.  In round 13 1993, Makepeace scored a try and kicked the winning goal as Norths came from 17-0 down against Canterbury to win 18–17.  Makepeace only managed to feature in three games over the next two seasons and was released by Norths at the end of 1995.

Post playing
In retirement, Makepeace has become a successful travel blogger and has over 4.2 million followers on Instagram.  He now resides in Raleigh, North Carolina.

References

Living people
Australian rugby league players
North Sydney Bears players
Rugby league wingers
Place of birth missing (living people)
Year of birth missing (living people)